MaMaSé! is the tenth studio album by the Belgian-Dutch girlgroup K3. The album is the first K3 album released featuring the new line-up: with Josje Huisman, who was found via a television contest called K2 zoekt K3, instead of Kathleen Aerts, who had left the group in March 2009. It was released on 20 November 2009 through label Studio 100.

The album contains two CDs. The first CD contains brand new original songs, and the second one contains a selection of K3's biggest hits, but now remixed and featuring new member Josje's voice. Three singles were released to promote the album: "De revolutie!", "MaMaSé!" and "De politie". MaMaSé! became a big hit and reached the peak position in both the Dutch and Flemish album charts.

Track listing

Personnel
Credits for MaMaSé! adapted from fan site.

K3:
 Karen Damen – main vocals
 Josje Huisman – main vocals
 Kristel Verbeke – main vocals
 Children's choir led by Kristof Aerts – vocals (background)
 Bella Beli – styling
 Hans Bourlon – text
 Alexia Ceulemans – choreography
 Peter Gillis – text, music, production, drums, programming
 Pietro Lacirignola – saxophone
 Kurt Lelièvre – percussion
 Dieter Limbourg – saxophone
 Carlo Mertens – trombone
 Patrick Mortier – trumpet
 Vincent Pierins – bass
 Serge Plume – trumpet
 Monique Stam – styling
 Patrick Steenaerts – guitars
 Children's choir Studio 100 Kids – vocals (background)
 Uwe Teichtert – mastering
 Pallieter Van Buggenhout – guitars
 Wim Van de Genachte – photography
 Jody Van Geert – styling
 Alain Vande Putte – text, music
 Johan Vanden Eede – music
 Danny Verbiest – text
 Ronny Verbiest – accordion
 Gert Verhulst – text 
 Geert Waegeman – violin
 Alexia Waku – vocals (background)
 Winke Walschap – make-up
 Miguel Wiels – text, music, production, keyboards

Chart performance

Weekly charts

Year-end charts

Certifications

References

External links
 
 

2009 albums
K3 (band) albums